The Ghost Train is a 1931 British comedy thriller film directed by Walter Forde and starring Jack Hulbert, Cicely Courtneidge and Ann Todd. It is based on the play The Ghost Train by Arnold Ridley. The film's art direction was by Walter Murton.

Thought to have been lost for some years, parts of the film (5 reels of images with 2 reels of sound) were recovered in a very decomposed state. It was part of the British Film Institute campaign in 1992 to locate missing movies.

Cast
 Jack Hulbert as Teddy Deakin
 Cicely Courtneidge as Miss Bourne
 Ann Todd as Peggy Murdock
 Cyril Raymond as Richard Winthrop
 Allan Jeayes as Dr. Sterling
 Donald Calthrop as Saul Hodgkin
 Angela Baddeley as Julia Price
 Henry Caine as Herbert Price
 Tracy Holmes as Charles Bryant
 Carol Coomb as Elsie Bryant

References

External links

1931 films
1930s comedy thriller films
Films directed by Walter Forde
British films based on plays
Gainsborough Pictures films
British comedy thriller films
1930s rediscovered films
Films set in England
Rail transport films
British black-and-white films
Remakes of British films
Sound film remakes of silent films
Rediscovered British films
1930s English-language films
1930s British films